Peter Warburton (born 3 September 1951) is a former Australian rules footballer who played with Carlton in the Victorian Football League (VFL). He later played for Port Melbourne and Williamstown in the Victorian Football Association (VFA). Warburton is the son of Carlton player, Keith.

Notes

External links 

Peter Warburton's profile at Blueseum

1951 births
Carlton Football Club players
Tatura Football Club players
Living people
Australian rules footballers from Victoria (Australia)
Port Melbourne Football Club players
Williamstown Football Club players